Peetrimõisa is a village in Viljandi Parish, Viljandi County, Estonia. It had a population of 199 as of 1 January 2010.

References

Villages in Viljandi County
Kreis Fellin